The SEAT Fura was a supermini car which was produced by Spanish car manufacturer SEAT between 1981 and 1986, and based on the Fiat 127, which had been built by the firm since April 1972. 

Once the license to the 127 had expired, SEAT was forced to develop a new version with a new name which was introduced in end of 1981 for the model year of 1982. It was available in three and five door hatchback body styles. Sales commenced in January 1982.

The two and four door sedan versions of the Fiat 127 were discontinued. The Fura was never available with the larger 1,010 cc unit which was seen in the SEAT 127, but did receive the five speed manual transmission as standard.

After the facelift of 1983, the SEAT Fura Dos (two) was introduced: it didn’t differ much from its predecessor mainly through smaller headlights and turn signals. The launch of the first generation SEAT Ibiza in April 1984 made the car largely redundant.

For slightly more than one year, these two compact hatches competed internally, but the somewhat outmoded Fura was officially discontinued in December 1986. A hot hatch called the Fura Crono was introduced in the beginning of in 1983. 

Fitted with spoilers front and rear, as well as twin fog lights up front and unique 13” alloy wheels, it was powered by the  1,438 cc four cylinder.

The car was also assembled by NASR in Cairo as the El Nasr Super Fura.

Motorsport
The SEAT Fura Crono was used in the Copa Fura one make rally series, which was launched in 1983 and terminated in 1985. The cars were tuned by Abarth and produced .

References
 

Fura
Subcompact cars
Front-wheel-drive vehicles
1980s cars
Cars introduced in 1981
Cars discontinued in 1986

Cars of Spain